The 2009 ISU World Team Trophy was an international figure skating competition in the 2008–09 season. The six countries with the best results during the season – in descending order of finish: the United States, Canada, Japan, France, Russia and China – selected two men's single skaters, two ladies' single skaters, one pair, and one ice dancing entry to compete in a team format. The planned Olympic team event will have one entry per discipline.

The country with the most points after all disciplines was awarded the trophy. The Japan Skating Federation (JSF) paid the prize money for the ISU World Team Trophy in 2009. Total prize money in 2009 was US$1,000,000, the highest ever at an ISU event.

Results

Team standing

Men

Ladies

Pairs

Ice dancing
There was no compulsory dance.

References

External links

 ISU result page

ISU World Team Trophy
ISU World Team Trophy in Figure Skating